The 1903 Yale Bulldogs football team represented Yale University in the 1903 college football season. The Bulldogs finished with an 11–1 record under first-year head coach George B. Chadwick.  The team outscored its opponents by a combined 312 to 206 score with the only loss being by an 11–6 score to Princeton.

Four Yale players (fullback Ledyard Mitchell, end Charles D. Rafferty, tackle James Hogan and guard James Bloomer) were consensus picks for the 1903 College Football All-America Team. Quarterback Foster Rockwell and halfback Harold Metcalf were also selected as first-team All-Americans by Charles Chadwick, and end Tom Shevlin was a first-team pick by the San Antonio Daily Light.

Schedule

References

Yale
Yale Bulldogs football seasons
Yale Bulldogs football